Hosszú or Hossu is a surname. Notable people with the surname include:

 Katinka Hosszú (born 1989), Hungarian swimmer
 Emil Hossu (1941–2012), Romanian actor
 Iuliu Hossu (1885–1970), bishop of the Romanian Greek Catholic Church
 Francisc Hossu-Longin (1847–1935), lawyer and memoirist 
 Elena Pop-Hossu-Longin (1862–1940), Romanian women's rights activist

See also 
 Hossu